Starmaker: Leviathan is a comic created by Adam Hamdy, with art by David Golding.  The first issue was published by Dare Comics in December 2009.

Plot 
No plot details have been released, but creator Adam Hamdy has described Starmaker: Leviathan as a Sci Fi epic.

References
Official Dare Comics website
Ain't It Cool News reviews Starmaker: Leviathan

British comics